The Latvia men's national under-18 ice hockey team is the men's national under-18 ice hockey team of Latvia. The team is controlled by the Latvian Ice Hockey Federation, a member of the International Ice Hockey Federation. The team represents Latvia at the IIHF World U18 Championships.

International competitions

IIHF World U18 Championships

1999: 1st in Division I Europe
2000: 3rd in Pool B
2001: 4th in Division I
2002: 4th in Division I
2003: 4th in Division I Group A
2004: 4th in Division I Group A
2005: 4th in Division I Group A
2006: 1st in Division I Group B
2007: 10th place
2008: 2nd in Division I Group B
2009: 1st in Division I Group B
2010: 9th place

2011: 1st in Division I Group A
2012: 9th place
2013: 10th place
2014: 1st in Division I Group A
2015: 9th place
2016: 9th place
2017: 10th place
2018: 1st in Division I Group A
2019: 8th place
2020: Cancelled due to the COVID-19 pandemic
2021: 9th place
2022: 7th place

External links
Latvia at IIHF.com

under
National under-18 ice hockey teams